The 2006 Conference USA men's basketball tournament was held March 8–11 at the FedExForum in Memphis, Tennessee.

Top-seeded Memphis defeated UAB in the championship game, 57–46, to clinch their first Conference USA men's tournament championship. It would be the Tigers' first of seven C-USA titles in an eight-year period.

The Tigers, in turn, received an automatic bid to the 2006 NCAA tournament. They were joined in the tournament by fellow C-USA member UAB, who earned an at-large bid.

Format
Conference USA saw some drastic changes to its membership prior to the season. Eight teams, Charlotte (Atlantic 10), Cincinnati (Big East), DePaul (Big East), Louisville (Big East), Marquette (Big East), Saint Louis (Atlantic 10), South Florida (Big East), and TCU (Mountain West), departed the conference, while six new teams were added, Marshall (MAC), Rice (WAC), SMU (WAC), Tulsa (WAC), UCF (Sun Belt), and UTEP (WAC). Total membership settled at twelve teams.

Even with all of the newly departed and -added teams, the tournament's format remained exactly the same. The top four teams were given byes into the quarterfinal round while the next eight teams were placed into the first round. The two teams with the worst conference records were not invited to the tournament. All remaining tournament seeds were determined by regular season conference records.

Bracket

References

Conference USA men's basketball tournament
Tournament
Conference USA men's basketball tournament
Conference USA men's basketball tournament